Mary of England may refer to:
 Mary I of England (1516–1558), Queen of England from 1553 until her death
 Mary II of England (1662–1694), Queen of England from 1689 until her death

See also
 Henrietta Maria of France (1609–1669), queen consort of England, also known as Queen Mary
 Mary of Modena (1685–1688), queen consort of England
 Mary of Scotland (disambiguation)
 Mary of Teck (1867–1953), queen consort of the United Kingdom and the British Dominions
 Mary of Waltham (1344–1362), daughter of Edward III of England
 Mary of Woodstock (1279–1332), daughter of Edward I of England
 Mary of York (1467–1482), daughter of Edward IV of England
 Mary Stuart (1605–1607), daughter of James VI and I
 Mary Tudor (disambiguation)
 Mary, Princess Royal and Princess of Orange (1631–1660), daughter of Charles I of England
 Princess Mary (disambiguation)
 Queen Mary (disambiguation)